This is a list of members of the Victorian Legislative Council from the elections of 16 September – 2 November 1868 to the elections of 24 August to 10 December 1870.

There were six Electoral Provinces and five members elected to each Province.

Note the "Term in Office" refers to that members term(s) in the Council, not necessarily for that Province.

James Palmer was President of the Council, William Mitchell was Chairman of Committees.

 Fawkner died 4 September 1869; replaced by Henry Walsh, sworn-in September 1869.
 Learmonth took leave of absence on or after September 1868 and resigned; replaced by Philip Russell, sworn-in April 1869.

References

 

Members of the Parliament of Victoria by term
19th-century Australian politicians